Clube Atlético Joseense, more commonly referred to as Joseense, is a Brazilian football club based in São José dos Campos, São Paulo. It competes in the Campeonato Paulista Segunda Divisão, the fourth tier of the São Paulo state football league. 

In 2005, Joseense signed a four-year partnership with Grupo HR Sports. In January 2014, the club changed name to São José dos Campos Futebol Clube, but due to the existence of São José Esporte Clube, the club was again renamed to Clube Atlético Joseense in October 2017.

Address
Av. Dr. João Guilhermino, 429
São José dos Campos - SP - 12210131
Telephone : (12) 3911-2283 -
Fax : (12) 3922-5574

Stadiums
Home Field 1: Estádio Martins Pereira - Capacity: 20,000
Home Field 2: Estádio ADC Parahyba - Capacity: 5,000

Information
Foundation: October 1, 1998
President: Carlos Davalo
Nickname: Tigre do Vale (Tiger of the Valley)
Kits: yellow and black shirt, black shorts and black socks

References

External links
Futebol Interior
Arquivo de Clubes

 
Association football clubs established in 1998
Organisations based in São José dos Campos
Football clubs in São Paulo (state)
1998 establishments in Brazil